Tabernaemontana bufalina is a species of plant in the family Apocynaceae. It is found in southern China, Indochina, and western Malaysia.

References

bufalina